Linda P. Fried (born 1949) is an American geriatrician and epidemiologist, who is also the first female Dean of Columbia University's Mailman School of Public Health. Her research career has focused on frailty, healthy aging, and how society can successfully transition to benefit from an aging population.

Early life and education
A native New Yorker and Jewish woman, she is the sister of the Stanford University professor Barbara Fried. Linda Fried attended Hunter College High School and earned a bachelor's degree in history from the University of Wisconsin–Madison in 1970. She received her MD from Rush Medical College in Chicago in 1979 and her MPH from Johns Hopkins in 1984 where she worked with Paul Whelton. She trained in internal medicine at Rush Presbyterian-St. Luke's Medical Center in Chicago. After fellowship training in internal medicine, she soon expanded her focus to the aging population and received a fellowship in Hopkin's geriatrics program.

Fried is married to immunologist Dr. Joseph Margolick. They have two sons.

Career
In 1985, Fried accepted joint faculty appointments in the Johns Hopkins School of Medicine and the School of Hygiene and Public Health. She went on to serve as director of geriatric medicine and the founding director of the Johns Hopkins Center on Aging and Health which studies the epidemiology of aging, relationships between aging and health, and interventions to improve health with aging. In 2008, Fried became the first female Dean of Columbia University's Mailman School of Public Health, DeLamar Professor of Epidemiology, professor of medicine at Columbia's College of Physicians and Surgeons; and senior vice president of Columbia University Medical Center.

Aging research and programs
Prior to Fried's work, frailty was an ambiguous medical term commonly referring to a number of ailments and disabilities. Fried developed biologically-based theory regarding the clinical presentation or phenotype of frailty and hypotheses regarding its etiology in dysregulation of genes and some physiologic systems. She has led scientific teams that developed an assessment tool and created a more concrete definition of frailty. Fried also instigated a number of key studies on the cause of frailty and has proposed and developed the idea of a frailty syndrome. Dr. Christine K. Cassel, president and chief executive officer of the American Board of Internal Medicine noted that Fried's work, “has become core knowledge and core teaching in every geriatric program” in the country.

In the early 1990s, Fried collaborated with the social activist Marc Freedman and others to design and develop a nationwide volunteer program called Experience Corps. The program trains adult volunteers, ages 55 and older, to improve the academic success of students in economically disadvantaged public elementary schools. Fried and Freedman codesigned the program to have a social impact with children and schools and as a public health intervention to improve the health of volunteers. A 2009 study using functional magnetic resonance imaging showed that participants experienced short-term gains in executive cognitive function compared with a control group. The program now exists in 19 cities across the United States under the aegis of AARP.

In 2010, Fried was listed as the third most highly cited author in the field of geriatrics and gerontology. Her 2001 paper Frailty in older adults: Evidence for a phenotype, for example, has been cited 5,513 times.

Mailman School of Public Health
As dean, Fried has led a major redesign of the School's MPH curriculum to reflect a new emphasis on interdisciplinary leaning based on a new vision of public health and health preservation and prevention for every stage of life. The revised curriculum, which includes leadership training and case-study based instruction in applying theory to practice, debuted in the fall of 2012. In 2011, she was instrumental in bringing the International Longevity Center, a research and advocacy center on aging that was founded by the late Robert N. Butler, to Columbia University. Fried led the School to build the nation's first program in a school of public health on climate and health and graduate degrees in this field and established the Global Consortium on Climate and Health Education; she launched the Lerner Center for Public Health Promotion, Columbia Public Health Corporate Partnerships, the Program in Global Health Justice and Governance, established a leading program in Data Science for Health. Among many other innovations, Fried has led the school in creation of research and educational initiatives on obesity prevention, system science, and public health approaches to preventing incarceration.

Fried is a member of the World Economic Forum's Global Agenda Council on Aging and the MacArthur Network on an Aging Society. She was the co-chair of the 2019-2022 National Academy of Medicine initiative for a Global Roadmap for Healthy Longevity.

Awards
2001–present, Elected Member, National Academy of Sciences Institute of Medicine
2001–present, Elected Member, Association of American Physicians
2001 Merit Award, National Institute on Aging
2011 Silver Innovator's Award, Alliance for Aging Research
2011 Enrico Greppi Prize, Italian Society of Gerontology and Geriatrics
2012, Silver Scholar Award, Alliance for Aging Research
2012, Longevity Prize, Fondation Ipsen
2016, Inserm International Prize
2018, Lifetime Achievement Award, International Conference on Frailty and Sarcopenia 
2019, The Alma Morani Renaissance Woman Award, Women in Medicine Legacy Foundation
2022, Kober Medal, Association of American Physicians

References

External links

Living people
1949 births
American public health doctors
American women academics
American women epidemiologists
American epidemiologists
Jewish American academics
Hunter College High School alumni
University of Wisconsin–Madison College of Letters and Science alumni
Rush Medical College alumni
Johns Hopkins Bloomberg School of Public Health alumni
Columbia University Mailman School of Public Health faculty
Members of the National Academy of Medicine
Women public health doctors
20th-century American scientists
20th-century American women scientists
21st-century American scientists
21st-century American women scientists
21st-century American academics
American geriatricians
Women geriatricians